Covaleda is a municipality located in the province of Soria, Castile and León, Spain. According to the 2004 census (INE), the municipality had a population of 1,924 inhabitants.

See also
Picos de Urbión

References

External links 
 Covaleda Town Hall Official site
 Covaleda Town Hall Non-official site: Descubre Covaleda
 Web del camping
 Imágenes del pueblo

Municipalities in the Province of Soria